{{DISPLAYTITLE:C10H18O2}}
The molecular formula C10H18O2 may refer to:

 Decalactones
 δ-Decalactone
 γ-Decalactone
 cis-2-Decenoic acid
 8-Hydroxygeraniol
 Multistriatin
 1-Octen-3-yl acetate
 Sobrerol